Crace is a suburb of Canberra, Australia in the district of Gungahlin. It was named after Edward Kendall Crace an original settler in the Gungahlin area. Streets in Crace are named after parishes and land divisions from colonial times. It is bounded by the Barton Highway, Gundaroo Drive, Nudurr Drive and Gungahlin Drive. Located in the suburb is the Canberra Nature Park of Gungaderra Grasslands nature reserve.

History

Development

The suburb has finished development and construction.

 Road construction commenced in July 2008.
 The construction of 21 display homes was completed in May 2009.
 By July 2012 more than half of the houses were complete.
 The majority of homes were complete by 2015.

The ACT government selected developers for the area as Defence Housing Australia and Canberra Investment Corporation. The developers were expected to make $60,000,000 but had to share half with the government. Some very small blocks were released for low cost housing with 85% released for high cost housing.  1,500 houses were planned for the 140 hectares, however more than 1,600 dwellings were built.

Streets

As part of the recent development, a new series of streets have been created following a Burley-Griffin grid pattern.
Phase 1 Streets:
 Abena Avenue (main street of Crace)
 Arcadia Street
 Baratta Street
 Benalla Street
 Carrawa Street
 Chance Street
 Cocoparra Crescent
 Digby Circuit
 Dobikin Street
 Durong Street
 Errol Street
 Fairfield Street
 Galore Street
 Harrow Street
 Hillcrest Street
 Junee Street
 Keewong Crescent
 Langtree Crescent
 Medhurst Crescent
 Narden Street
 Narden Street
 Parilia Street
 Quain Street
 Rylstone Crescent
 Stowport Avenue (incorporates an urban linear park)
 Taplow Street
 Ultimo Street
 Vandyke Street
 Wadeye Street
 Yinnar Street
 Zanci Street
 Fingal Street

Existing facilities

The suburb also encompasses Gungahlin Hill, which hosts the transmission facilities for the following radio stations:
 ABC Radio National
 666 ABC Canberra
 1RPH
 Mix 106.3
 1053 2CA
 1206 2CC
 Hit 104.7
Crace has a local shopping complex which includes Supabarn, The District (restaurant/pub), Chicken Gourmet, Capital Chemist, Blue Poppy Hair, Club Lime, Sibu Beauty, Coffee Guru, Verve Chiropractic, Crace Medical Centre, and B Best Thai Massage.

Like the majority of new Canberra suburbs, Crace is a cat containment area: all cats have to be kept inside the cat owner's property and within an enclosure if outside.

Geography

Crace Grasslands Nature Reserve and Crace Hill are not completely located in Crace despite the name; their southern parts are located in the adjacent suburb of Lyneham. It also has a CSIRO Sustainable Ecosystems area.

Geology

On the North west side of Crace the rock is middle Silurian age Canberra Formation slaty shale and mudstone.  In the mid west is siltstone.  Towards Gungahlin Hill there is some sandstone at the base of the siltstone deposit, then over an unconformity to lower Silurian age State Circle Shale, and then mudstone.  On Gungahlin Hill the rocks are from the Ordovician age Pittman Formation with greywacke and bands of the Acton Shale Member.  The east side of Crace also has Silurian Canberra Formation with the top of Crace Hill having vesicular Dacite overlying mudstone.  Crace Hill has been designated as a geological monument. The Gungahlin Fault curves around the south east side of Gungahlin Hill, and heads north north east out of Crace.  The Winslade Fault comes into the south of Crace over the top of Gungahlin Hill and curves north into Palmerston.

References

External links

 Crace Community Association website

Suburbs of Canberra